Dmytro Vitaliyovych Voloshyn (born 2 February 1986) is a Ukrainian retired professional footballer who played as a defender.

Club history
Dmytro Voloshyn began his football career at Krystal-Ametist club in Oleksandriya. During the 2004–05 and 2005–06 seasons he played for Olexandria. In 2006, he transferred to FC Kremin Kremenchuk. He left the club at the end of 2008–09 season but came back to Kremin before season started.

Career statistics

References

External links
  Profile - Official Kremin site
  FC Kremin Kremenchuk Squad on the PFL website
 
 

1986 births
Living people
People from Oleksandriia
Ukrainian footballers
Association football defenders
MFC Olexandria players
FC Kremin Kremenchuk players
FC Stal Kamianske players
Ukrainian Second League players